Ardi Qejvani (born 28 January 1993) is an Albanian football player who currently plays as a midfielder for Oriku in the Albanian First Division.

References

1993 births
Living people
Footballers from Vlorë
Albanian footballers
Association football midfielders
Flamurtari Vlorë players
KF Himara players
Luftëtari Gjirokastër players
KF Butrinti players
KS Sopoti Librazhd players
KF Oriku players
Kategoria Superiore players
Kategoria e Parë players
Kategoria e Dytë players